El Furrial is a town located in Maturín Municipality in the state of Monagas, Venezuela

It is the birthplace of politician Diosdado Cabello.

References

Populated places in Monagas